Capital International may refer to:

Capital International, a division of Capital Group Companies
Beijing Capital International Airport
Beijing Capital International Airport Company Limited
Capital Region International Airport, Lansing Michigan

See also
Dubai International Capital
China International Capital Corp
MSCI, Morgan Stanley indices licensed from Capital International
Capital (disambiguation)
International (disambiguation)